Engelbert III von der Mark (English: Engelbert III of the Mark) (1304 – 25 August 1368) was the Archbishop-Elector of Cologne from 1364 until 1368 and the Prince-Bishop of Liège (as Engelbert) from 1345 until 1364.

Engelbert was the second son of Count Engelbert II of the Mark. Through the influence of his uncle Adolph II of the Marck, Bishop of Liège, he became the Provost of Liège in 1332. Later he was also mentioned as being a Provost in Cologne.

After the death of his uncle, he was appointed Prince-Bishop of Liège by Pope Clement VI. In 1362 he applied to become the Archbishop-Elector of Cologne, but his nephew Adolph III gained it in 1363. Nevertheless, after Adolph abdicated in the following year he was appointed Archbishop-Elector in 1364 by Pope Urban V and resigned the Prince-Bishopric of Liège. Engelbert was beset by health problems soon after taking office. In 1366 he accepted coadjutors to assist in the running of the archdiocese, and the Archbishop-Elector of Trier Kuno II of Falkenstein was selected.

Engelbert died in 1368 and was buried in Cologne Cathedral.

References

1304 births
1368 deaths
House of La Marck
Archbishop-Electors of Cologne
Dukes of Westphalia
14th-century Roman Catholic archbishops in the Holy Roman Empire
Burials at Cologne Cathedral
Prince-Bishops of Liège